Tai Hong Wai is a walled village located in the Kam Tin area of Yuen Long District, in Hong Kong. Three other walled villages, Kat Hing Wai, Wing Lung Wai, and Kam Hing Wai are located nearby and were built around the same time.

Administration
Tai Hong Wai is a recognized village under the New Territories Small House Policy.

References

External links

 Delineation of area of existing village Tai Hong Wai (Kam Tin) for election of resident representative (2019 to 2022)
 Antiquities Advisory Board. Historic Building Appraisal. Entrance Gate, Tai Hong Wai, Kam Tin Pictures
 Antiquities Advisory Board. Historic Building Appraisal. Watchtower (northwest), No. 9F Tai Hong Wai, Kam Tin Pictures
 Pictures of Tai Hong Wai

Walled villages of Hong Kong
Kam Tin
Villages in Yuen Long District, Hong Kong